The Hilman Hornet is a two place homebuilt helicopter.

Development
The Hillman Hornet is a two place side by side helicopter designed for homebuilt construction. it features an enclosed cabin without side doors. The helicopter was an evolution of the Helicom H-1 Commuter Jr funded by 10 San Luis Obispo County investors.

Variants
HornetStandard piston engined homebuilt helicopter.
Turbo Hornet Turboshaft powered variant of the Hornet

Specifications (Hillman Hornet)

See also

References

Helicopters